Charles Talton "Turkey" Hughes (April 22, 1902 – August 31, 1985) was an American college football, basketball and baseball player and coach.  He served as the head football coach at Eastern Kentucky University from 1929 to 1934.  The baseball field at Eastern Kentucky, Turkey Hughes Field, is named in his honor.

References

External links
 Big Blue History profile

1902 births
1985 deaths
Kentucky Wildcats baseball players
Kentucky Wildcats football players
Kentucky Wildcats men's basketball players
Kentucky Wildcats men's track and field athletes
Eastern Kentucky Colonels athletic directors
Eastern Kentucky Colonels baseball coaches
Eastern Kentucky Colonels men's basketball coaches
Eastern Kentucky Colonels football coaches
People from Richmond, Kentucky
American men's basketball players
Basketball coaches from Kentucky
Basketball players from Kentucky